Het Rijk der Vrouw (Dutch: Woman's Realm) was a Belgian women's magazine published between 1925 and 1990.

History and profile
Het Rijk der Vrouw was established in 1924 and was first published in 1925. The magazine was part of Almaspar. The target audience was young women as well as experienced housewives. The magazine covered articles on fashion, home decoration and marriage. It was a conservative magazine and emphasized family values and connoisseurship.

In 1990 Het Rijk der Vrouw went bankrupt and then, merged with Libelle, another Belgian women's magazine.

See also
 List of magazines in Belgium

References

1924 establishments in Belgium
1990 disestablishments in Belgium
Conservatism in Belgium
Conservative magazines
Defunct magazines published in Belgium
Dutch-language magazines
Lifestyle magazines
Magazines established in 1924
Magazines disestablished in 1990
Magazines published in Flanders
Women's magazines published in Belgium